Pixy (stylized in all caps) is a South Korean girl group formed in 2021 by Allart Entertainment and Happy Tribe Entertainment. They debuted on February 24, 2021, with the digital single "Wings". The group consists of five members: Lola, Dia, Sua, Dajeong and Rinji. Original group members Ella and Satbyeol left the lineup on August 27, 2022, due to health concerns.

History

Pre-debut 
Ella was the former leader of the group Cherry Bullet under the stage name Mirae. She left the group on December 13, 2019, with members Kokoro and Linlin due to personal reasons. Satbyeol was a former member of the group Girls' Alert. On April 24, 2020, the company Roots Entertainment pushed back the release of the group's album due to worsening situation caused by the COVID-19 pandemic. Three members chose to stay, while Satbyeol would join a new agency. Satbyeol also participated in JTBC's Mix Nine, where she finished 93rd. Dajeong was a former member of the kids group SUPA, the group later disbanded in 2018.

2021: Debut, Bravery and Temptation 
On February 24, Pixy officially debuted with their digital single "Wings".

On May 20, Pixy released their first EP Bravery and its lead single "Let Me Know".

On October 7, Pixy released their second EP Temptation and its lead singles "Addicted" and "Bewitched".

2022: Reborn and Ella and Satbyeol's departures 
The group released their third EP, titled Reborn, on June 15, 2022. Member Ella wouldn't participate as she took a break due to health concerns.

On August 27, Allart Entertainment announced that due to their worsening health conditions, Ella and Satbyeol would officially be leaving Pixy and the group would be reorganized as four members.

On September 27, Allart Entertainment announced that Hwang Rin-ji, under the stage name Rinji, would be joining the group at the start of their European tour "Wanna Be Your Villain".

Members 

Adapted from their Naver profile and Reposition clip.

Current
 Lola – rapper
 Dia – leader, dancer, vocalist
 Sua – vocalist
 Dajeong – vocalist
 Rinji – rapper

Former
 Ella - leader, vocalist
 Satbyeol – rapper

Timeline

Discography

Extended plays

Single albums

Singles

Awards and nominations

References 

2021 establishments in South Korea
Musical groups from Seoul
K-pop music groups
Musical groups established in 2021
South Korean dance music groups
South Korean girl groups